The tibialis posterior muscle is the most central of all the leg muscles, and is located in the deep posterior compartment of the leg. It is the key stabilizing muscle of the lower leg.

Structure
The tibialis posterior muscle originates on the inner posterior border of the fibula laterally. It is also attached to the interosseous membrane medially, which attaches to the tibia and fibula.

The tendon of the tibialis posterior muscle (sometimes called the posterior tibial tendon) descends posterior to the medial malleolus. It terminates by dividing into plantar, main, and recurrent components.  The main portion inserts into the tuberosity of the navicular bone. The smaller portion inserts into the plantar surface of the medial cuneiform.  The plantar portion inserts into the bases of the second, third and fourth metatarsals, the intermediate and lateral cuneiforms and the cuboid. The recurrent portion inserts into the sustentaculum tali of the calcaneus.

Blood is supplied to the muscle by the posterior tibial artery.

Nerve supply 
The tibialis posterior muscle is supplied by the tibial nerve.

Function 
The tibialis posterior muscle is a key muscle for stabilization of the lower leg. It also contracts to produce inversion of the foot, and assists in the plantarflexion of the foot at the ankle. The tibialis posterior has a major role in supporting the medial arch of the foot. Dysfunction of the tibialis posterior, including rupture of the tibialis posterior tendon, can lead to flat feet in adults, as well as a valgus deformity due to unopposed eversion when inversion is lost.

Clinical significance 

Injury to the distal tendon of the tibialis posterior muscle is rare. It may be caused during exercise. It usually presents with pain on the medial side of the ankle. Injuries including dislocations and tears often require surgery.

Additional images

References

External links 

 
 Diagram at washington.edu
 Diagram at latrobe.edu.au

Calf muscles
Muscles of the lower limb